Seligmann is a name meaning "blessed man" in German and Yiddish. It may refer to:

Places
 Seligman, Arizona
 Seligman, Missouri

Other uses 
 Seligmann (name), for a list of people bearing the surname
 Seligman Crystal, an award of the International Glaciological Society
 J. & W. Seligman & Co., investment bank founded in 1862
 Jacques Seligmann & Company, French and American company dealing in antiques and modern art
 M. Seligman & Co., Israeli law firm

See also
Selig (name)
Seliger, Seeliger
Zelig (disambiguation)